Annabel Blanchard (born 7 May 2001) is an English professional footballer who plays as forward for Crystal Palace in the FA Women's Championship. Blanchard is known for her outstanding technical ability and complete two footedness which is a rarity in the women's game.August 2022 Blanchard signed for Crystal Palace

Club career
Blanchard started her senior career with Liverpool of the FA Women's Super League. She made her professional debut on 24 April 2018 against Arsenal. Blanchard would go on to make one more appearance for Liverpool before joining Leicester City ahead of the 2019–20 season. In January 2021 she joined Blackburn Rovers.

International career
Blanchard  represented England throughout the U14 to U19 levels, including scoring twice in three appearances at the 2018 UEFA Women's Under-17 Championship in Lithuania.

Career statistics
.

References

External links

Living people
Women's association football forwards
2001 births
English women's footballers
Women's Super League players
Liverpool F.C. Women players
Leicester City W.F.C. players
Blackburn Rovers L.F.C. players